Racing Club de France Football (also known as Racing Paris, RCF Paris, Matra Racing, Racing Club, or Racing) is a French association football club based in Colombes, a suburb of Paris.

Racing was founded in 1882 as a multi-discipline sports club, and is one of the oldest clubs in French football history. The team plays in the Championnat National 2, the fourth level of French football. Racing is managed by  Guillaume Norbert and hosts its home matches at the Stade Lucien-Choine, a smaller stadium next to the Stade Olympique Yves-du-Manoir in Colombes.

Racing Club de France, founded in 1882, was a founding member of Ligue 1. The club has won one Ligue 1 title (in 1935–36) and five Coupe de France titles, and is tied for fourth-best. Racing also played in the Union des Sociétés Françaises de Sports Athlétiques-sanctioned league, France's first championship league. The club debuted in the league in 1899 and won the championship in 1907 after finishing second in 1902 and 1903. The club holds the Ligue 1 record for most goals scored during a 38-match season with 118 goals in 1959–60.

Notable players include Roger Marche, Oscar Heisserer, Thadée Cisowski, Raoul Diagne, Luis Fernández, Maxime Bossis, David Ginola, Luís Sobrinho, Pierre Littbarski, Enzo Francescoli, Alfred Bloch, and Rubén Paz. Diagne spent a decade with the club (1930–1940) and, in 1931, was the first black player on the France national team. He played in the 1938 FIFA World Cup with Abdelkader Ben Bouali, his Racing teammate who was one of the first North African players on the national team. From 2009 to 2012, the club moved to nearby Levallois-Perret after reaching a financial agreement with the commune.

History 

During the 1900 Summer Olympics, Racing Club de France hosted the athletics events at Croix-Catelan Stadium (the club's previous home). Racing's zenith was the 1930s and 1940s, when the club won Ligue 1 in 1936 and the Coupe de France in 1936, 1939, 1940, 1945 and 1949. The club was also successful in the early 1960s, finishing second in the first division in 1961 and 1962. However, Racing was a focal point of the financial crisis affecting French football during the mid-1960s. The club's financial struggles resulted in its relegation to the lower divisions.

In 1982, businessman Jean-Luc Lagardère wanted to build a team of stars and invested in the club as a second major club in Paris (with Paris Saint-Germain). Although he considered a merger of Paris FC and Racing, the Racing management refused due to a lack of detailed information on PFC finances. Lagardère bought the Paris FC (incurring a debt of more than four million francs) and renamed it "Paris Racing 1". Lagardère invested in experienced players in 1982 and 1983.

Lagardère, determined to lead his club to the European Cup draws in 1987, hired Portuguese coach Artur Jorge after Jorge's victory in the European Cup with FC Porto. He completed the team with Gérard Buscher and Pascal Olmeta. However, the club fell on hard times and attendance declined. During the late 1980s, Racing lost 300 million francs.

The club, relegated to the amateur levels, sought firmer financial footing. In December 2008, Georgios Kintis tried unsuccessfully to buy the club. Before the 2009–10 season, Racing reached a financial agreement with the city of Levallois. The club's association and support from the commune resulted in a name change to Racing Club de France Levallois 92. Despite assistance from Levallois, Racing was relegated to the Championnat de France amateur 2 by the DNCG in July 2010 after it was determined that the club had a €500,000 debt. On 21 November 2010, Racing Levallois and UJA Alfortville announced plans to merge for the following season. In 2012, the club returned to Colombes as Racing Club de France Colombes 92.

Name changes 
 Racing Club de France: (1896–1932, 1966–1981, 2005–2007) 
 Racing Club de Paris: (1932–1966, 1981–1987, 1999–2005) 
 Matra Racing: (1987–1989) 
 Racing Paris 1: (1989–1991) 
 Racing 92: (1991–1995) 
 Racing Club de France 92: (1995–1999) 
 Racing Club de France football 92: (2007–2009)
 Racing Club de France Levallois 92: (2009–2012)
 Racing Club de France Colombes 92: (2012–2018)
 Racing Club de France Football: (2018–present)

Players

Current squad

As of 18 August 2022

Past players 
The following players have represented Racing in league and international competition since the club's foundation in 1882. They have played in at least 100 official matches for the club, or achieved prominence elsewhere. For a complete list of RCF Paris players, see :Category:Racing Club de France football Colombes 92 players.

 Pierre Allemane
 Manuel Anatol
 Henri Bard
 Alfred Bloch
 Luis Fernández
 Maxime Bossis
 Thadée Cisowski
 Edmond Delfour
 Raoul Diagne
 David Ginola
 Youssef Darbaki
 Oscar Heisserer
 François Heutte
 Auguste Jordan
 Jean-Jacques Marcel
 Roger Marche
 Sonny Silooy
 Pascal Olmeta
 Roger Quenolle
 Ernest Vaast
 Guy Van Sam
 Émile Veinante
 René Vignal
 Halim Benmabrouk
 Rabah Madjer
 Rodolphe Hiden
 Joseph Ujlaki
 Pierre Littbarski
 Abderrahman Mahjoub
 Vahap Özaltay
 Enzo Francescoli
 Miloš Milutinović
 Albert Guðmundsson
 Walid Regragui

Officials 
President : Patrick Norbert
Vice-president : Guillaume Norbert
General secretary : –
Manager : Guillaume Norbert
Assistant manager : Serge Gnonsoro

Managers

Honours 
Ligue 1 champions: 1936
Runners-up: 1961, 1962
Ligue 2 champions: 1986
Championnat National 2: 2004 (Group D)
Championnat National 3: 2007 (Group F), 2022 (Group L)
Division d'Honneur (Paris Île-de-France) championship: 1973
Coupe de France champions: 1936, 1939, 1940, 1945, 1949
Runners-up: 1930, 1950, 1990
Union des Sociétés Françaises de Sports Athlétiques Championship: 1907
USFSA Paris Championship: 1902, 1903, 1907, 1908, 1911, 1919
FFFA Ligue de Paris champions: 1931, 1932
Coupe Dewar champions: 1905, 1906, 1907, 1912
Runners-up: 1901

References

External links 
  
 Official Facebook

 
1882 establishments in France
Association football clubs established in 1882
Football clubs in Paris
Racing Club de France
Sport in Hauts-de-Seine
Ligue 1 clubs